Axel Nils Viktor Sjöberg (born 11 June 1995 in Stockholm) is a Swedish curler.

He is a 2019 Swedish mixed curling champion and played at the 2019 World Mixed Curling Championship.

Teams

Men's

Mixed

Mixed doubles

Personal life
Axel Sjöberg is from family of curlers: his father is Bernt Sjöberg, wheelchair curler, he is 2006 Winter Paralympics bronze medallist; his younger sister is Fanny Sjöberg, Swedish women's champion, she currently plays in Isabella Wranå's team.

References

External links
 
 

Living people
1995 births
Sportspeople from Stockholm
Swedish male curlers
Swedish curling champions
Competitors at the 2019 Winter Universiade
21st-century Swedish people